The  class was a class of two "all-big-gun" battlecruisers of the German Imperial Navy built between 1909–1911. The s were slightly larger, faster, and better armored, and had an additional pair of  guns.

Both ships served during World War I.  participated in several major battles with the rest of the High Seas Fleet, including the battles of Dogger Bank and Jutland in the North Sea, and the Battle of the Gulf of Riga and Operation Albion in the Baltic Sea. At the end of the war,  was interned with the majority of the High Seas Fleet at Scapa Flow while the ships' fate was being discussed during peace treaty negotiations. The ships were scuttled on 21 June 1919 to prevent their seizure by the Allies.

 was stationed in the Mediterranean at the start of the war; she escaped from pursuing Royal Navy ships to Constantinople. The ship, along with the light cruiser , was transferred to the Ottoman Navy soon after arrival. Strategically,  played a very important role: she helped bring the Ottoman Empire into the war as a member of the Central Powers, and by acting as a fleet in being the ship prevented Anglo-French attempts to force the Bosporus, and similarly stymied a possible advance by the Russian Black Sea Fleet.  was retained by the new Turkish government after the war. Only slightly modified from her original configuration, the ship remained on active service with the Turkish Navy until being decommissioned on 20 December 1950; she was stricken from the Navy register on 14 November 1954. Two years earlier, when Turkey joined NATO in 1952, the ship was assigned the hull number B70. The ship was unsuccessfully offered for sale to the West German government in 1963. Without a group willing to preserve her as a museum, the ship was sold to M.K.E. Seyman in 1971 for scrapping. She was towed to the breakers on 7 June 1973, and the work was completed in February 1976.

Development 
During a May 1907 conference, the German Naval Office decided to follow up the unique battlecruiser  with an enlarged design. However, Admiral Alfred von Tirpitz, along with the Construction Department, argued that increasing the number of guns from 8 to 10 would be preferable, as the 28 cm guns had been deemed sufficient to engage even battleships. Tirpitz also argued that, given the numerical superiority of the Royal Navy's reconnaissance forces, it would be more prudent to increase the number of main guns, rather than increase their caliber. The General Navy Department held that for the new design to fight in the battle line, 30.5 cm guns were necessary. It was also mandated by the Construction Department that the new ships have armor protection equal or superior to s and a top speed of at least .

During the design process, there were many weight increases due to growth in the size of the citadel, armor thickness, additions to the ammunition stores, and the rearrangement of the boiler system. It was originally planned to build only one ship of the new design, but due to the strains being put on the Navy design staff, it was decided to build two ships of the new type. They were assigned under the contract names of "Cruiser G" and "Cruiser H". As Blohm & Voss made the lowest bid for "Cruiser G", the company also secured the contract for "Cruiser H". The former was assigned to the 1908–09 building year, while the latter was assigned to 1909–10.

The contract for "Cruiser G" was awarded on 17 September 1908, under building number 200. The keel was laid on 7 December 1908, and the ship was launched on 7 April 1910. "Cruiser G" was commissioned on 30 September 1911 as SMS . The ship's namesake was Field Marshal Helmuth von Moltke, the Chief of Staff of the Prussian Army in the mid 19th century. "Cruiser H" was ordered on 8 April 1909 with the building number 201. The ship's keel was laid on 12 August 1909; the hull was launched on 28 March 1911. After fitting-out, "Cruiser H" was commissioned on 2 July 1912 as SMS . The ship was named for August Karl von Goeben, a Prussian general who served during the Franco-Prussian War.

Ships

Design

General characteristics 
The ships displaced  normally, and  fully loaded. The -class ships had 15 watertight compartments and a double bottom that ran for 78% of the keel of the ships. They were considered to handle well, with gentle movement even in heavy seas. However, they were slow to answer the helm and were not particularly maneuverable. The ships lost up to 60% speed and heeled 9 degrees at full rudder. The ships had a standard crew of 43 officers and 1010 men. While  served as the flagship of I Scouting Group, this increased by 13 officers and 62 men. While serving as the second command flagship, the ship carried an additional 3 officers and 25 men to the standard complement.

Propulsion 
After 1916, the boilers were supplemented with tar-oil sprayers that were used to increase the burn rate of the low quality lignite coal available to Germany. The Parsons turbines were divided into high- and low-pressure pairs. The low-pressure turbines were the inner pair, and were placed in the aft engine room. The high-pressure turbines were on either side of the low-pressure pair, and were located in the forward wing rooms. The turbines powered four propellers,  in diameter.

The -class ships were equipped with 6 turbo generators that delivered  of power at 225 volts. The ships were designed to carry 1,000 tons of coal, although in practice they could store up to 3,100 tons.

Armament 

The main armament was ten 28 cm SK L/50 guns in five twin turrets. The guns were placed in Drh.L C/1908 turret mounts; these mountings allowed a maximum elevation of 13.5 degrees. The guns could fire at a rate of 3 rounds per minute, and had a muzzle velocity of 895 m/s (2,940 ft/s). A total of 810 of these shells were stored aboard the ship.

The guns had a total of 1800 shells, at 150 per gun. Initially, twelve  guns were also fitted to defend the ships against torpedo boats and destroyers, but these were later removed, with the guns in the aft superstructure replaced with four 8.8 cm Flak L/45 guns.

Armor 
The ships were equipped with Krupp cemented armor. The deck armor and sloping armor were both , as was the torpedo bulkhead around the barbettes.

Service history

replaced the armored cruiser  in I Scouting Group on 30 September 1911. On 19 April 1912,  and light cruisers  and  departed Germany for a goodwill visit to the United States, and arrived on 30 May. In early July,  escorted Kaiser Wilhelm II's yacht to Russia. Once the ship returned, the commander of I Scouting Group made  his flagship—a role in which she served until Rear Admiral Franz von Hipper transferred his flag to the newer battlecruiser  on 23 June 1914.

 participated in most of the major fleet actions conducted by the German Navy during the First World War, including the Battles of Dogger Bank and Jutland in the North Sea, and the Battle of the Gulf of Riga and Operation Albion in the Baltic. The ship took part in several operations to bombard the English coast, including the first raid on Yarmouth, the attack on the towns of Scarborough, Hartlepool, and Whitby, and the second raid on Yarmouth and Lowestoft.  was damaged several times during the war: the ship was hit by heavy-caliber gunfire at Jutland, and torpedoed twice by British submarines while on fleet advances.

Following the end of the war in 1918, together with most of the High Seas Fleet, was interned at Scapa Flow pending a decision by the Allies as to the fate of the fleet. The ship met her end when she was scuttled by her crew, along with the rest of the High Seas Fleet in 1919 to prevent them from being seized by the British Royal Navy.

Following the outbreak of the First Balkan War in October 1912, the German High Command decided to create a Mediterranean Division in an attempt to exert influence in the area. The ships visited several Mediterranean ports, including Venice, Pola, and Naples. The First Balkan War ended on 30 May 1913, and there was some consideration given to withdrawing the pair to German waters. However, the conflict reignited less than a month later on 29 June, meaning the ships would have to remain in the area.

The ships were then ordered to steam to Constantinople. , flying the Ottoman flag, bombarded the Russian port of Sevastopol, captured and sank a Russian minesweeper, and damaged a destroyer on 29 October 1914. The Russian government responded by declaring war on the Ottoman Empire on 1 November; Britain and France followed suit on 5 November. By acting as a fleet in being,  effectively blocked a Russian advance into the Bosporus, and defended against a similar incursion of British and French pre-dreadnoughts. More powerful British and French warships—which could have dealt with —could not be risked in the heavily mined and U-boat patrolled Turkish waters.

In 1936 she was officially renamed  and remained the flagship of the Turkish Navy until 1950, although the ship was largely stationary in Izmit from 1948. In 1952, Turkey joined NATO, and the ship was assigned the hull number "B70".  was decommissioned on 20 December 1950, and removed from the navy register on 14 November 1954. The Turkish government attempted to preserve the ship as a museum, including an offer to West Germany to sell the ship back in 1963, but none of the efforts were successful.  was sold for scrapping in 1971, and was eventually broken up between 1973 and 1976—the last remaining ship of the Imperial German Navy.

Footnotes

Notes

Citations

References

Further reading
 
 
 
 

Battlecruiser classes
 
Moltke class battlecruiser